The Women's +75 kg weightlifting event at the 2006 Commonwealth Games took place at the Melbourne Exhibition Centre on 22 March 2006.

Schedule
All times are Australian Eastern Standard Time (UTC+10)

Records
Prior to this competition, the existing world, Commonwealth and Games records were as follows:

The following records were established during the competition:

Results

References

Weightlifting at the 2006 Commonwealth Games